Bloomsburg University of Pennsylvania (Bloomsburg, BU or Bloom) is a campus of Commonwealth University of Pennsylvania and it is located in Bloomsburg, Pennsylvania. It is part of the Pennsylvania State System of Higher Education (PASSHE). The campus is accredited by the Middle States Commission on Higher Education with some degree programs accredited by specialized accreditors.

History
It was established as Bloomsburg Academy in 1839. In 1856, it was renamed Bloomsburg Literary Institute. The name became Bloomsburg Literary Institute and State Normal School in 1869. In 1916, the state of Pennsylvania took control and named it Bloomsburg State Normal School. The name was changed to Bloomsburg State Teachers College in 1927. In 1960, the name was changed to Bloomsburg State College. The name was changed to the current Bloomsburg University of Pennsylvania on July 1, 1983.

Bloomsburg terminated its Greek Life program on May 13, 2021.

In July 2021, Pennsylvania higher education officials announced that Bloomsburg would merge with Mansfield University and Lock Haven University in response to financial difficulties and declining enrollment, and each institution would represent a campus of a single university. In March 2022, the new institution was created to oversee the three campuses, and was named the Commonwealth University of Pennsylvania.

Academics
In 2019-20, Bloomsburg University showed enrollment of 7,992 undergraduate and 697 graduate students.

In 2019–2020, the university employed approximately 521 faculty. The student-to-faculty ratio was roughly 17:1 with 96% of its faculty holding terminal degrees in their field.

Athletics

Notable alumni

References

External links
 
 Bloomsburg University Athletics website

 
American Association of State Colleges and Universities
Universities and colleges in Columbia County, Pennsylvania
Educational institutions established in 1839
1839 establishments in Pennsylvania
Public universities and colleges in Pennsylvania